François Walthéry (born 17 January 1946 in Argenteau near Liège) is a Belgian comics artist, best known for his series featuring an adventurous flight attendant, Natacha.

Biography
Walthéry began his career in 1962 during studies at the Institut Saint-Luc in Liège, when he collaborated with scenario writer Mittéï to create his first comic, Pipo. The following year, Walthéry started working for Peyo, assisting on The Smurfs, Johan et Pirlouit and Benoît Brisefer. Eventually he assumed creative responsibility of the series Jacky et Célestin, taking over from Will.

He started his best known work series in 1967, working with a script by Gos to create Natacha. Several years in the making, the series did not make its debut until 26 February 1970, in the Franco-Belgian comics magazine Spirou.

Partial bibliography

Natacha
Natacha, hôtesse de l'air (written by Gos), Dupuis, 1971.
Natacha et le Maharadjah (written by Gos), Dupuis, 1972.
La mémoire de métal (written by Étienne Borgers), Dupuis, 1974. Also contains Un brin de panique (written by Marc Wasterlain)
Un Trône pour Natacha (written by Maurice Tillieux), Dupuis, 1975.
Double vol, (written by Mittéï and Walthéry, Dupuis), 1976. Also contains L'étoile du berger (written by Gos) and Un tour de passe-passe (written by Lemasque).
Le treizième apôtre (written by Maurice Tillieux), Dupuis, 1978.
L'hôtesse et Mona Lisa (written by Mittéï, additional art by Pierre Seron), Dupuis, 1979. Also contains  (written by Walthéry and Mittéï).
Instantanés pour Caltech (written by Étienne Borgers, additional art by Jidéhem), Dupuis, 1981.
Les machines incertaines (written by Étienne Borgers, additional art by Jidéhem), Dupuis, 1983.
L'ile d'outre-monde (written by Marc Wasterlain, additional art by Will), Dupuis, 1984.
Le grand pari (written by Mittéï, additional art by Laudec), Dupuis, 1985.
Les culottes de fer (written by Mittéï, additional art by Laudec), Dupuis, 1986.
Les nomades du ciel (written by Raoul Cauvin, additional art by Laudec), Dupuis, 1988.
Cauchemirage (written by Mythic, additional art by Mittéï), Marsu Productions, 1989.
La ceinture du Cherchemidi (written by Peyo, additional art by Mittéï), Marsu Productions, 1992.
L'ange blond (written by Maurice Tillieux, additional art by Georges Van Linthout), Marsu Productions, 1994.
La veuve noire (written by Michel Dusart, additional art by Georges Van Linthout), Marsu Productions, 1997.
Natacha et les dinosaures (written by Marc Wasterlain), Marsu Productions, 1998.

Le Vieux Bleu (written by Raoul Cauvin), Dupuis, 1980 translated in Walloon under the title Li vî Bleû
 Le p'tit bout d'chique
Le p'tit bout d'chique, Marsu Productions, 1989
Bout à bout (written by Serdu), Marsu Productions, 1992

Rubine
Les mémoires troubles (written by Mythic), Le Lombard, 1993
Fenêtre sur rue (written by Mythic), Le Lombard, 1994
Le second témoin (written by Mythic), Le Lombard, 1995...later continued by other artists.

Sources

 François Walthéry publications in Spirou BDoubliées 
 François Walthéry albums Bedetheque 

Footnotes

External links
 Walthery official site 
 François Walthéry biography on Lambiek Comiclopedia
 François Walthéry biography on Dupuis

1946 births
Belgian comics artists
Belgian comics writers
Belgian humorists
Living people
Walloon people
Belgian writers in French